{{DISPLAYTITLE:Dopamine receptor D1}}

Dopamine receptor D1, also known as DRD1. It is one of the two types of D1-like receptor family - receptors D1 and D5. It is a protein that in humans is encoded by the DRD1 gene.

Tissue distribution

D1 receptors are the most abundant kind of dopamine receptor in the central nervous system.

Northern blot and in situ hybridization show that the mRNA expression of DRD1 is highest in the dorsal striatum (caudate and putamen) and ventral striatum (nucleus accumbens and olfactory tubercle).

Lower levels occur in the basolateral amygdala, cerebral cortex, septum, thalamus, and hypothalamus.

Function 
D1 receptors regulate the memory, learning, and the growth of neurons, also is used in the reward system and locomotor activity, mediating some behaviors and modulating dopamine receptor D2-mediated events.

They play a role in addiction by facilitating the gene expression changes that occur in the nucleus accumbens during addiction.

They are Gs/a coupled and can stimulate neurons by indirectly activating cyclic AMP-dependent protein kinase.

Production 
The DRD1 gene expresses primarily in the caudate putamen in humans, and in the caudate putamen, the nucleus accumbens and the olfactory tubercle in mouse. Gene expression patterns from the Allen Brain Atlases in mouse and human can be found here.

Ligands 
There are a number of ligands selective for the D1 receptors. To date, most of the known ligands are based on dihydrexidine or the prototypical benzazepine partial agonist SKF-38393 (one derivative being the prototypical antagonist SCH-23390).  D1 receptor has a high degree of structural homology to another dopamine receptor, D5, and they both bind similar drugs. As a result, none of the known orthosteric ligands is selective for the D1 vs. the D5 receptor, but the benzazepines generally are more selective for the D1 and D5 receptors versus the D2-like family. Some of the benzazepines have high intrinsic activity whereas others do not. In 2015 the first positive allosteric modulator for the human D1 receptor was discovered by high-throughput screening.

Agonists

Several D1 receptor agonists are used clinically. These include apomorphine, pergolide, rotigotine, and terguride. All of these drugs are preferentially D2-like receptor agonists. Fenoldopam is a selective D1 receptor partial agonist that does not cross the blood-brain-barrier and is used intravenously in the treatment of hypertension. Dihydrexidine and adrogolide (ABT-431) (a prodrug of A-86929 with improved bioavailability) are the only selective, centrally active D1-like receptor agonists that have been studied clinically in humans. The selective D1 agonists give profound antiparkinson effects in humans and primate models of PD, and yield cognitive enhancement in many preclinical models and a few clinical trials. The most dose-limiting feature is profound hypotension, but the clinical development was impeded largely by lack of oral bioavailability and short duration of action. In 2017, Pfizer made public information about pharmaceutically-acceptable non-catechol selective D1 agonists that are in clinical development.

List of D1 receptor agonists
 Dihydrexidine derivatives
 A-86929 - full agonist with 14-fold selectivity for D1-like receptors over D2
 Dihydrexidine - full agonist with 10-fold selectivity for D1-like receptors over D2 that has been in Phase IIa clinical trials as a cognitive enhancer.  It also showed profound antiparkinson effects in MPTP-treated primates,  but caused profound hypotension in one early clinical trial in Parkinson's disease. Although dihydrexidine has significant D2 properties, it is highly biased at D2 receptors and was used for the first demonstration of functional selectivity with dopamine receptors.
 Dinapsoline - full agonist with 5-fold selectivity for D1-like receptors over D2
 Dinoxyline - full agonist with approximately equal affinity for D1-like and D2 receptors
 Doxanthrine - full agonist with 168-fold selectivity for D1-like receptors over D2
 Benzazepine derivatives
 SKF-81297 - 200-fold selectivity for D1 over any other receptor
 SKF-82958 - 57-fold selectivity for D1 over D2
 SKF-38393 - very high selectivity for D1 with negligible affinity for any other receptor
 Clozapine - partial agonist at D1-like receptors
 Fenoldopam - highly selective peripheral D1 receptor partial agonist used clinically as an antihypertensive
 6-Br-APB - 90-fold selectivity for D1 over D2
 Others
 Stepholidine - alkaloid with D1 agonist and D2 antagonist properties, showing antipsychotic effects
 A-68930
 A-77636
 CY-208,243 - high intrinsic activity partial agonist with moderate selectivity for D1-like over D2-like receptors, member of ergoline ligand family like pergolide and bromocriptine.
 SKF-89145
 SKF-89626
 7,8-Dihydroxy-5-phenyl-octahydrobenzo[h]isoquinoline: extremely potent, high-affinity full agonist
 Cabergoline - weak D1 agonism, highly selective for D2, and various serotonin receptors
 Pergolide - (similar to cabergoline) weak D1 agonism, highly selective for D2, and various serotonin receptors
 A photoswitchable agonist of D1-like receptors (azodopa) has been described that allows reversible control of dopaminergic transmission in wildtype animals.

Antagonists
Many typical and atypical antipsychotics are D1 receptor antagonists in addition to D2 receptor antagonists. But Asenapine has shown stronger D1 receptor affinity compared to other antipsychotics. No other D1 receptor antagonists have been approved for clinical use. Ecopipam is a selective D1-like receptor antagonist that has been studied clinically in humans in the treatment of a variety of conditions, including schizophrenia, cocaine abuse, obesity, pathological gambling, and Tourette's syndrome, with efficacy in some of these conditions seen. The drug produced mild-to-moderate, reversible depression and anxiety in clinical studies however and has yet to complete development for any indication.

List of D1 receptor antagonists
 Benzazepine derivatives
 SCH-23,390 - 100-fold selectivity for D1 over D5
 Ecopipam (SCH-39,166) - a selective D1/D5 antagonist that was being developed as an anti-obesity medication but was discontinued However, it has showed promise in reducing Stuttering and is currently in Phase 2 Trials for this purpose

Modulators
 DETQ − PAM
 LY-3154207 – potent and subtype selective PAM, in phase 2 studies for Lewy body dementia.

Protein–protein interactions
Dopamine receptor D1 has been shown to interact with:

 COPG2,
 COPG,  and
 DNAJC14.

Receptor oligomers 
The D1 receptor forms heteromers with the following receptors: dopamine D2 receptor, dopamine D3 receptor, histamine H3 receptor, μ opioid receptor, NMDA receptor, and adenosine A1 receptor.

 D1–D2 receptor complex
 D1−H3−NMDAR receptor complex − a target to prevent neurodegeneration
 D1–D3 receptor complex
 D1–NMDAR receptor complex
 D1–A1 receptor complex

Structure   

Several CryoEM structures of agonists bound to the dopamine D1 receptor complexed with the stimulatory heterotrimeric Gs protein have been determined. Agonist interact with extracellular loop 2 and extracellular regions of trans-membrane helices 2, 3, 6, and 7. Interactions between catechol-based agonists and three trans-membrane serine residues including S1985.42, S1995.43, and S2025.46 function as microswitches that are essential for receptor activation.

See also 
 Dopamine receptor

References

External links 
 
 

Dopamine receptors